The 1981 United Airlines Tournament of Champions was a women's tennis tournament played on outdoor hard courts at the Grenelefe Golf & Tennis Resort in Haines City, Florida in the United States. It was part of the Toyota International Series circuit of the 1981 WTA Tour and classified as a Category 7 event. It was the second edition of the tournament and was held from April 28 through May 3, 1981. First-seeded Martina Navratilova won her second consecutive singles title at the event and earned $50,000 first-prize money.

Finals

Singles
 Martina Navratilova defeated  Pam Casale 6–2, 6–2
It was Navratilova's 6th singles title of the year and the 51st of her career.

Doubles
 Martina Navratilova /  Pam Shriver defeated  Rosie Casals /  Wendy Turnbull 6–2, 6–1

Prize money

Notes

References

External links
 ITF tournament edition details

United Airlines Tournament of Champions
United Airlines Tournament of Champions
1981 in sports in Florida
1981 in American tennis
April 1981 sports events in the United States
May 1981 sports events in the United States